The Italy women's national cricket team is the team that represents the country of Italy in international women's cricket matches. They have been an associate member of the International Cricket Council (ICC) since 1995, having previously been an affiliate member since 1984. The Italian women's national cricket team is administered by the Italian Cricket Federation.

In April 2018, the ICC granted full Women's Twenty20 International (WT20I) status to all its members. Therefore, all Twenty20 matches played between Italy women and another international side after 1 July 2018 will be a full WT20I.

History 
In 2023, it was announced Italy would participate in the qualifying process for the ICC Women's T20 World Cup for the first time, by playing in the Europe Division Two qualifier in Jersey.

Activity of national teams

The activities of national teams (men and women) are available at this link.

Information to more activities pertaining to women's matches is available here

Records and statistics
International Match Summary — Italy Women
 
Last updated 14 November 2022

Twenty20 International 

T20I record versus other nations

Records complete to WT20I #1302. Last updated 14 November 2022.

See also
 List of Italy women Twenty20 International cricketers

References

External links
 Official website – mostly in Italian.
 FemaleCricket-Italy
 Cricinfo Italy

Cricket in Italy
Women's national cricket teams
Italy in international cricket
Cricket